Dokgo Young-jae (born Jeon Young-jae on December 13, 1953) is a South Korean actor. He made his film debut in 1973, and also became active in the Dongrang Theatre Ensemble. Dokgo won Best Supporting Actor for White Badge at the Blue Dragon Film Awards in 1992, then became a household name late in his career with the television drama My Mother's Sea in 1993.

His father, actor Dokgo Seong dominated Korean cinema in the 1950s and 1960s.

Filmography

Film

Television series

Theater

Awards and nominations

References

External links 
 
 
 

1953 births
Living people
People from Gangneung
South Korean male film actors
South Korean male television actors
South Korean male stage actors
South Korean Buddhists